Lottia is a genus of sea snails, specifically true limpets, marine gastropod mollusks in the subfamily Lottiinae of the family Lottiidae, one of the families of true limpets.

Species
According to the World Register of Marine Species (WoRMS), the following species with accepted names are included within the genus Lottia :

 Lottia abrolhosensis (Petuch, 1979)
 Lottia acutapex (S. S. Berry, 1960)
 Lottia albicosta (Adams, 1845) 
 † Lottia alveus, (Conrad, 1831) - eelgrass limpet, became extinct in the 20th century
  Lottia angusta (Moskalev in Golikov & Scarlato, 1967)
 Lottia antillarum G.B. Sowerby I, 1834
 Lottia argrantesta Simison & Lindberg, 2003
 Lottia asmi (Middendorff, 1847) -- black limpet
 Lottia atrata (Carpenter, 1857)
 Lottia austrodigitalis (Murphy, 1978) This species is cryptic species and a sibling species with Lottia digitalis. Existence of Lottia austrodigitalis as separate species was genetically confirmed in 2007.
 Lottia borealis (Lindberg, 1982)  -- boreal limpet
 Lottia cassis (Eschscholtz, 1833)
 Lottia cellanica (Christiaens, 1980)
 Lottia conus (Test, 1945)
 Lottia cubensis (Reeve, 1855)
 Lottia dalliana (Pilsbry, 1891)
 Lottia digitalis (Rathke, 1833) - ribbed limpet
 Lottia discors (Philippi, 1849)
 Lottia dorsuosa (Gould, 1859)
 Lottia edmitchelli (Lipps, 1963)
 Lottia emydia (Dall, 1914)
 Lottia fascicularis (Menke, 1851)
 Lottia fenestrata (Reeve, 1855)
 Lottia filosa (Carpenter, 1865)
 Lottia formosa (Christiaens, 1980)
 Lottia gigantea G.B. Sowerby I, 1834 - owl limpet
 Lottia goshimai Nakayama, Sasaki & Nakano, 2017
 Lottia iani Scuderi, Nakano & Eernisse, 2021
 Lottia immaculata (Lindberg & McLean, 1981)
 Lottia instabilis (Gould, 1846) -- unstable limpet
 Lottia jamaicensis (Gmelin, 1791) - Jamaica limpet
 Lottia kogamogai Sasaki & Okutani, 1994
 Lottia langfordi (Habe, 1944)
 Lottia leucopleura (Gmelin, 1791) - black-rib limpet
 Lottia limatula (Carpenter, 1864) - file limpet
 Lottia lindbergi Sasaki & Okutani, 1994
 Lottia luchuana (Pilsbry, 1901)
 Lottia marcusi (Righi, 1966)
 Lottia mesoleuca (Menke, 1851)
 Lottia mimica Lindberg & McLean, 1981
 Lottia mitella (Menke, 1847) 
 Lottia mixta (Reeve, 1855)
 Lottia mortoni (Christiaens, 1980)
 Lottia noronhensis (E. A. Smith, 1890)
 Lottia onychitis (Menke, 1843)
 Lottia orbignyi (Dall, 1909)
 Lottia painei Lindberg, 1987
 Lottia paradigitalis (Fritchman, 1960)
 Lottia pediculus (Philippi, 1846)
 Lottia peitaihoensis (Grabau & S. G. King, 1928)
 Lottia pelta (Rathke, 1833) - shield limpet
 Lottia persona (Rathke, 1833)
 Lottia rothi (Lindberg & McLean, 1981)
 Lottia scabra (Gould, 1846) - rough limpet
 Lottia scutum (Rathke, 1833)
 Lottia septiformis (Quoy & Gaimard, 1834)
 Lottia smithi Lindberg & McLean, 1981
 Lottia stanfordiana (Berry, 1957)
 Lottia strigatella (Carpenter, 1864)
 Lottia strongiana (Hertlein, 1958)
 Lottia subrotundata (Carpenter, 1865)
 Lottia subrugosa (d'Orbigny, 1846)
 Lottia tenuisculptata Sasaki & Okutani, 1994
 Lottia tranquebarica (Gmelin, 1791)
 Lottia triangularis (Carpenter, 1864) -- triangular limpet
 Lottia turveri (Hertlein & Strong, 1951)
 Lottia versicolor (Moskalev in Golikov & Scarlato, 1967)

Species brought into synonymy
 Lottia cymbiola (Gould, 1846): synonym of Scurria variabilis (G.B. Sowerby I, 1839)
 Lottia depicta (Hinds, 1842): synonym of Tectura depicta (Hinds, 1842)
 Lottia insessa (Hinds, 1842): synonym for Discurria insessa (Hinds, 1842)
 Lottia ochracea (Dall, 1871): synonym of Lottia instabilis (Gould, 1846)
 Lottia paleacea (Gould, 1853): synonym of Tectura paleacea (Gould, 1853)
 Lottia rosacea (Carpenter, 1864): synonym of Tectura rosacea (Carpenter, 1864)
 Lottia testudinalis (Müller, 1776): synonym of Testudinalia testudinalis (O. F. Müller, 1776)
 Lottia variabilis (Sowerby, 1839): synonym of Scurria variabilis (G.B. Sowerby I, 1839)

The following species are also: synonym of species in current use by the Indo-Pacific Molluscan Database 
 Lottia areneosa (Gould, 1846)
 Lottia heroldi (Dunker, 1861)
 Lottia (Lottia) compressa (Linnaeus, 1758)
 Lottia (Lottia) patina (Eschscholtz in Rathke, 1833)
 Lottia (Lottia) radiata (Eschscholtz in Rathke, 1833)
The Integrated Taxonomic Information System (ITIS) adds the following species  
 Lottia ochracea (Dall, 1871) -- yellow limpet : synonym of Lottia instabilis (Gould, 1846)

References

Further reading

 Nakano & Ozawa (2007). Worldwide phylogeography of limpets of the order Patellogastropoda: Molecular, morphological and palaeontological evidence. Journal of Molluscan Studies 73(1) 79-99

Lottiidae
Taxa named by John Edward Gray